Krattaspis is a genus of trilobites in the order Phacopida (family Cheiruridae), that existed during the lower Ordovician in what is now Estonia. It was described by Öpik in 1937, and the type species is Krattaspis viridatus. The type locality was the Maekula Strata.

References

External links
 Krattaspis at the Paleobiology Database

Cheiruridae
Phacopida genera
Fossil taxa described in 1937
Ordovician trilobites
Fossils of Estonia